Lu Yen-hsun successfully defended his title by defeating Jimmy Wang 7–5, 6–3 in the final.

Seeds

Draw

Finals

Top half

Bottom half

References
 Main Draw
 Qualifying Draw

Samsung Securities Cup - Singles
2011 Men's Singles